The Tough Guy is a 1961 Greek comedy film produced by Finos Films and was directed by Giannis Dalianidis and starred Kostas Hatzichristos, Martha Vourtsi, Martha Karagianni and Kostas Voutsas. It is a cinematographic representation of the play by Georgios Roussos. In its first week of screening in Athens and Piraeus, the movie sold 38,764 tickets placing it 14th in the 68 Greek films in 1961–62.

Cast
Kostas Hatzichristos ..... Iraklis Leontopoulos
Martha Vourtsi ..... Aleka Palli
Martha Karagianni ..... Foula Davari
Kostas Voutsas ..... Patatas
Joly Garbi ..... Andromachi
Vangelis Protopapas ..... Kalogirou
Takis Hristoforidis ..... police officer
Kostas Papachristos ..... Mistos Davaris
Sperantza Vrana ..... Loula
Margarita Athanasiou ...... Marika
Kostas Naos ..... Berketis
Giorgos Tsitsopoulos ..... Takis
Nassos Kedrakas ..... Thanasis
Stavros Paravas ..... police officer
Golfo Bini ..... maid

External links

1961 films
Greek comedy films
1960s Greek-language films
1961 comedy films
Finos Film films
Films directed by Giannis Dalianidis